The Royal Spanish Sailing Federation (RFEV) is the national governing body for the sport of sailing in Spain, recognised by the International Sailing Federation. The Federation is based in Madrid with a high performance centre located at Santander.

Yacht clubs
See :Category:Yacht clubs in Spain

Notable sailors
See :Category:Spanish sailors

Olympic sailing
See :Category:Olympic sailors of Spain

Offshore sailing
See :Category:Spanish sailors (sport)

References

External links
 Official website

Spain
Sailing
Yachting associations
Sailing governing bodies
Sailing in Spain
Organisations based in Spain with royal patronage